Igor Gerônimo Silva de Oliveira (born 16 December 1989), simply known as Igor, is a Brazilian footballer who plays for Cuiabá as a forward.

Club career
Born in Cuiabá, Mato Grosso, Igor made his debuts as a senior with Mixto. In April 2009 he moved to Paraná, and made his debut for the club on 1 August, coming on as a second-half substitute in a 1–2 away loss against Duque de Caxias for the Série B championship.

After being rarely used, Igor was loaned to Rio Branco-PR, São Carlos and his former club Mixto. In 2013, already a free agent, he signed for Cuiabá.

In October 2013 Igor moved to CRB. After being rarely used, he joined Portuguesa on 11 June 2015.

Igor returned to Cuiabá in 2016. After trying to assault his manager Fernando Marchiori during a match against Operário-VG in April, he was released.

References

External links

1989 births
Living people
People from Cuiabá
Brazilian footballers
Association football forwards
Campeonato Brasileiro Série B players
Campeonato Brasileiro Série C players
Campeonato Brasileiro Série D players
Mixto Esporte Clube players
Paraná Clube players
Rio Branco Sport Club players
Cuiabá Esporte Clube players
Associação Portuguesa de Desportos players
Sportspeople from Mato Grosso